Andrea Pierobon  (born 19 July 1969) is an Italian football coach and a former player who played mostly for Cittadella as a goalkeeper. He works as a goalkeeping coach with Cittadella. He holds the record for being the oldest professional player in the history of Italian football.

Pierobon rejoined the team that originally signed him to act as a role model for the youth on the squad.

References

1969 births
Living people
People from Cittadella
Italian footballers
Association football goalkeepers
Serie B players
U.S. Massese 1919 players
S.P.A.L. players
S.S. Fidelis Andria 1928 players
Treviso F.B.C. 1993 players
Venezia F.C. players
A.S. Cittadella players
Sportspeople from the Province of Padua
Footballers from Veneto